Trapezites may refer to:

 Trapezites (genus), a genus of butterflies endemic to Australia
 Trapezite, the ancient word for a banker in Greece